Al-Qurna District is a district of the Basra Governorate, Iraq. Its seat is the town of Al-Qurna.
It is located at 30°53′7″N 47°17′27″E.
The West Qurna Field is located in the district.

The Iraqi marsh lands, which are known as the Garden of Eden, surround this area in the lower part of the Mesopotamian basin. The area had played a prominent part in the history of mankind and was inhabited since the dawn of civilization.

Districts of Basra Province